The University of Caldas, is a public, coeducational, research university based in Manizales, Caldas, Colombia. It is the most important higher education institution in the Department of Caldas. It is a public university of national character, subject to inspection and surveillance through Law 1740 of 2014 and Law 30 of 1992 of the Ministry of Education of Colombia; it houses students from all corners of Colombia and abroad;  It is considered the best university in the "eje cafetero" and one of the best in Colombia.

Academic programs

Undergraduate 
FACULTY OF AGRICULTURAL SCIENCES
 Agronomy
 Veterinary Medicine and Zootechnics

FACULTY OF LAW AND SOCIAL SCIENCES 
 Anthropology
 Law
 Family Development
 Sociology
 Social Work
 BA in Social Studies
 History
FACULTY OF NATURAL AND EXACT SCIENCES
 Biology
 Geology
 BA in Biology and Chemistry
 Mecatronics Engineering
 Electronics Technology

FACULTY OF HEALTH SCIENCES
 Nursing
 BA in Physical Education, Recreation and Sports
 Medicine

FACULTY OF ENGINEERING
 Food Engineering
 Computers
 Systems Technology

FACULTY OF ARTS AND HUMANITIES
 Plastic Arts
 Visual Design
 Philosophy and Letters
 BA in Philosophy and Letters
 BA in Scenic Arts
 BA in Modern Languages
 BA in Music

Graduate 
Graduate Doctoral Degrees
 Agricultural Sciences
 Biomedical Sciences
 Design and Interactive Creation
 Educational Sciences

Master's Degrees
 Agricultural Production Systems
 Biomedical Sciences
 Chemistry
 Culture and Drugs
 Design and Interactive Creation
 Earth Sciences
 Education
 English Didactics
 Family Studies and Development
 Fito pathology
 Gerontology
 Philosophy
 Rural Societies
 Social Sciences
 Veterinary Sciences

Specializations
 Administration and Evaluation
 Administrative Law
 Agribusiness Management
 Agro-industrial Development
 Anesthesiology
 Bovine Production systems
 Chemistry
 Clinic Geriatrics
 Clinical Gastroenterology
 Clinical Surgical Gastroenterology
 Commercial and Financial Legislation
 Computer Assisted Mathematics
 Criminal Studies
 Dermatology
 Family Relationships Intervention
 General Surgery
 Geotechnics
 Gynecology and Obstetrics
 Health Promotion
 Inter Agro-Alimentary Business
 Internal Medicine
 Ophthalmology
 Pediatric Surgery
 Pediatrics
 Psychiatry
 Rural Development
 Tax and Customs Legislation
 Technical and Economic Evaluation
 University Teaching

Noted people

Notable alumni
Famous personalities among its alumni  include:
 Humberto De la Calle
 Elizabeth Castillo Vargas, LGBT activist and writer
 Lyda Osorio, physician, epidemiologist and infectious disease specialist

See also

 List of universities in Colombia

References

External links
 University of Caldas official site 

Universities and colleges in Colombia